Circulation: Cardiovascular Intervention is a peer-reviewed scientific journal published by Lippincott Williams & Wilkins for the American Heart Association. It focuses on interventional techniques for the surgical treatment of vascular and coronary artery disease, and structural heart disease. Other aspects of interventional cardiology are also part of its scope, including diagnostic and pharmacological aspects of cardiology as well as cardiovascular physiology. Primary type of articles published are original research, randomized trials, and large registry studies.

References

External links 
Circulation: Cardiovascular Intervention home page

See also
 Circulation (journal)
 Circulation: Cardiovascular Imaging
 Journal of the American College of Cardiology
 European Heart Journal

Cardiology journals
Lippincott Williams & Wilkins academic journals
American Heart Association academic journals